The Gulf of Ob (also known as Bay of Ob) is a bay of the Arctic Ocean, located in Northern Russia at the mouth of the Ob River. It is the world's longest estuary.

Geography
The mouth of the Gulf of Ob is in the Kara Sea between the Gyda and Yamal peninsulas. It generally runs north and south. The Taz Estuary is an eastern side-branch formed by the Taz River.

There are several islands near the mouth of the Ob, at the beginning of the estuary, such as Khaley Island. All these islands are close to the shore and they are generally flat and low-lying. They are protected wetlands under Ramsar. Further north, except for a few islands located close to the shore, such as Khalevigo and Nyavigo, the Gulf of Ob is free of islands until it meets the Kara Sea.

Beluga whales seasonally migrate to the Gulf of Ob.

Hydrocarbons
Very large natural gas and petroleum deposits have been discovered in this region. To the west is the Yamal project to develop resources in the Yamal Peninsula. To the south-east the Yamburg gas field is the world's third largest natural gas field, located between the southern portion of the gulf and the Taz Estuary to the east. Oil and gas from the wells are sent south via pipeline and rail transport.

A new port has been developed at Sabetta, on the west bank of the gulf, to support the Yamal LNG plant. Commercial operation started in December 2017 with the loading of the first LNG carrier.

Gazprom's Arctic Gate offshore oil loading terminal is in the gulf, designed to operate where ice could be over two meters thick.

See also
Ob River

References

External links
Islands at the mouth of the Ob
Protected wetlands
A very thorough paper about this region

Ob
Bodies of water of Yamalo-Nenets Autonomous Okrug
Ob River
Ramsar sites in Russia
Ob